Tarphonomus is a genus of birds in the family Furnariidae. They are found in shrubby habitats in south-central South America. They were formerly included in the genus Upucerthia. It contains the following species:

References
 SACC (2007). Recognize the genus Tarphonomus for two "Upucerthia". Accessed 2008-10-28.

 
Bird genera